The MOC Public Targeting Program was a very popular program that followed the Mars Global Surveyor's pictures of Mars. A total of 4,636 requests came in from the general public.  Of these, 1,086 were photographed by the Mars Observer Camera.  Many of the requests eventually resulted in publications.  A little more than half of the requests came from a single member of the general public.  One of the people wrote in the Planetary Report that working with MGS was as exciting as being a football fan able to run a few plays in the Super Bowl.  Images from the Public Target program can be found at http://www.msss.com/moc_gallery/

Examples of pictures taken through Public Target program

See also 

 HiWish program
 Mars Global Surveyor
 Mars Orbiter Camera

References

External links
http://www.msss.com/moc_gallery/

Geology of Mars